Henry Bayntun (17 December 1664 – June 1691) was an English politician who sat in the House of Commons between 1685 and 1691.

Bayntun was the son of Sir Edward Bayntun and his wife Stuarta Thynne daughter of Sir Thomas Thynne (cir 1610-1669).

Bayntun was elected Member of Parliament MP for Chippenham in 1685 and sat until 1690. He was then elected MP for Calne in 1690 and sat until his death in 1691.

During the 1680s Henry Bayntun  purchased Hinton Priory, Farleigh Hungerford Castle and surrounding estates from Sir Edward Hungerford.

References

1664 births
1691 deaths
English MPs 1685–1687
English MPs 1689–1690
English MPs 1690–1695